Wankaner is a village in Savli taluka of Vadodara district in state of Gujarat, India. It is located 30 km from its district place Vadodara. It is 5 km away from taluka place Savli.

Near By cities

Wankaner is surrounded by Anand district, Umreth Taluka, Vadodara Taluka.
Savli, Umreth, Anand, Vadodara, Dakor are the nearby Cities.

Population

References

Villages in Vadodara district